Podotricha is a genus of butterflies of the subfamily Heliconiinae in the family Nymphalidae.

Species
Podotricha judith (Guérin-Ménéville, 1844)
Podotricha telesiphe (Hewitson, 1867) – podotricha longwing

References

Heliconiini
Nymphalidae genera
Taxa named by Charles Duncan Michener